Alphaea turatii is a moth of the family Erebidae. It was described by Charles Oberthür in 1911. It is found in Sichuan, China.

References

Moths described in 1911
Spilosomina
Moths of Asia